The 1988 OFC Men's Olympic Qualifying Tournament determined which Oceania Football Confederation (OFC) team would qualify directly to complete at the 1988 Summer Olympics men's football tournament.

The qualifications had two rounds. The first round had three teams per group, with the group winner going directly into the second round. The runner-up of each group completed in a one-way play-off to determine who participated in the second round. Israel qualified directly into the second round.

Before the first round begun, Papua New Guinea and Fiji pulled out, leaving each group with only two teams. It was decided to have two match playoffs instead.

First round

Group one
Papua New Guinea withdraw before the games started

Group two
Fiji withdraw before the games started

Playoff
The losers of each group had a one-off match for a place in the second round

Second round

Final standings and matches

References 

OFC Men's Olympic Qualifying Tournament